Okaloosa may refer to:
Okaloosa Island
Okaloosa County, Florida

See also
Okaloosa darter
Okaloosa-Walton College
Okaloosa Regional Airport